The name Basil (royal, kingly) comes from the male Greek name Vassilios (female version ), which first appeared during the Hellenistic period. It is derived from "basileus", of greek origin, meaning "king", "emperor" or "tzar", from which words such as basilica and basilisk (via Latin) as well as the eponymous herb basil (via Old French) derive, and the name of the Italian region Basilicata, which had been long under the rule of the Byzantine Emperor (also called basileus).

It was brought to England by the Crusaders, having been common in the eastern Mediterranean. It is more often used in Britain and Europe than in the United States. It is also the name of a common herb.

In Arabic, Bas(s)el  (bāsil) is a name for boys that means "brave, fearless, intrepid".

Different derived names in different languages include Barsegh in Armenian; Basile in French; Basilius in German; Basilio in Italian and Spanish; Basílio in Portuguese; Basileo in Galician; Vasyl in Ukraine; Vasile in Romanian; Vasil in Bulgarian; Vasilije in Serbian; Vasily in Russian; Bazil, Bazsó, Vászoly and Vazul in Hungarian.

Basil may refer to the following people:

Rulers
Basil Onomagoulos (died 717), Byzantine usurper in Sicily in 717
Basil I (811–886) the Macedonian, Byzantine Emperor from 867
Basil II Bulgaroktonus (958–1025), Byzantine Emperor from 976
Basil Lekapenos (died c. 985), chief administrator of the Byzantine Empire from 945
Basil of Trebizond (died 1340), ruled from 1332
Fasilides (1603–1667), Ethiopian Emperor from 1603
 Basil of Naples, the first Duke of Naples from 661 to 666

Generals
Basil Apokapes, Byzantine general of the mid-11th century
Basil Boioannes, Catepan of Italy in 1017–1027
Basil Mesardonites, Catepan of Italy in 1010–1017
Basil Theodorokanos, Catepan of Italy in 1043

Religious figures
Basil of Caesarea (330–379), also known as Saint Basil the Great, a 4th-century bishop of Caesarea
Basil the Elder, father of Basil the Great and saint of the Eastern Orthodox Church
Basil of Ancyra (died 362), a 4th-century martyr
Basil of Amasea, a fourth-century Christian bishop and martyr
Basil I of Bulgaria, the first Patriarch of the Bulgarian Orthodox Church 	(c. 1186 – c. 1232) after restoring Tarnovo Patriarchate
Basil II of Bulgaria, Patriarch of the Bulgarian Orthodox Church (c. 1246 – c. 1263)
Basil III of Bulgaria, Patriarch of the Bulgarian Orthodox Church (c. 1254–1263)
Basil Fool for Christ (born 1468 or 1469, died 1552 or 1557), a Russian saint
Basil of Ostrog (1610–1671), bishop and saint of the Eastern Orthodox Church
Basil the Physician (died 1118), Bogomil leader burned at the stake as a heretic
Basil of Seleucia (died probably between 458 and 460), a metropolitan bishop of Seleucia ad Calycadnum
Basil the Confessor (died 750), Eastern Orthodox saint
Basil Hopko (1904–1976), bishop of the Slovak Greek Catholic Church and martyr
Basil Hume (1923–1999), English Roman Catholic cardinal and Archbishop of Westminster
Basil Moreau (1799–1873), French Roman Catholic priest who founded the Congregation of Holy Cross and was beatified
variant Baselios
Baselios I bar Baldoyo, Maphrian of the East (828–830) (See List of maphrians)
Baselios II, Maphrian of the East (848–868) (See List of maphrians)
Baselios III, Maphrian of the East (936–960) (See List of maphrians)
Baselios IV of Tagrit, Maphrian of the East (1046–1069) (See List of maphrians)
Baselios Behnam Hadliyo (died 1454), Maphrian of the East (1404–1412), later Ignatius Behnam Hadliyo, Patriarch of Antioch, and head of the Syriac Orthodox Church from 1445 until his death in 1454
Baselios Philoxenus, Maphrian of the East (1471–1487) (See List of maphrians)
Baselios Abraham, Maphrian of the East (1496–1508) (See List of maphrians)
Baselios Solomon (died 1518), Maphrian of the East of the Syriac Orthodox Church, from 1509 until his death in 1518
Baselios Blias, Maphrian of the East (1518–1523) (See List of maphrians) 
Baselios, Maphrian of Mosul, a great number of maphrians all called Baselios (See List of maphrians#Maphrians of Mosul (1533–1860)
Baselios Lazarus III (died 1713), Maphrian of the East of the Syriac Orthodox Church, from 1709 until his death in 1713.
Baselios Sakralla III of Aleppo (died 1764), Maphriyano (Catholicos) of the Syriac Orthodox Church of the East from 1748–1760. He came to India in 1751 and was buried there
Baselios Cleemis (born 1959), Cardinal, Major Archbishop-Catholicos of the Syro-Malankara Catholic Church
Baselios Paulose I (1836–1913), Catholicos of the East, the First Catholicos of the Malankara Orthodox Syrian Church from 1912 to 1913
Baselios Paulose II (1914–1996), Catholicos of India of the Jacobite Syrian Christian Church from 1975 to 1996
Baselios Mar Thoma Paulose II (1946–2021), Catholicos of the East of the Malankara Orthodox Syrian Church from 2010
Baselios Thomas I (born 1929), Catholicos of India, Maphrian, head of the Jacobite Syrian Christian Church, the Syriac Orthodox Church in India
Baselios Yeldo (1593–1685), a Saint, Maphrian of the East of the Syriac Orthodox Church from 1678 until his resignation in 1684
Cyril Baselios (1935–2007), Maphrian, the first Major Archbishop of the Syro-Malankara Catholic Church
variant Basilides
Basilides (2nd century AD), Egyptian Gnostic religious teacher

Given name 
 Basil Arthur (1928–1985), New Zealand politician
 Basil Kiiza Bataringaya (1927–1972) Ugandan politician
 Basil Bennett (1894–1938), American athlete and Olympic bronze medal winner in hammer throw
 Basil Bernstein (1924–2000), British sociologist and linguist
 Basil Brooke, 1st Viscount Brookeborough (1888–1973), politician and third Prime Minister of Northern Ireland
 Basil W. Brown (1927–1997), American politician
 Basil Bunting (1900–1985), British modernist poet
 H. Basil Christian (1871–1950), South African/Rhodesian farmer and horticulturalist
 Basil Dearden (1911–1971), British film director
 Basil W. Duke (1838–1916), Confederate American Civil War general and historian
 Air Chief Marshal Basil Embry (1902–1977), British Royal Air Force officer
 Basil Favis, Canadian chemist and professor
 Basil Gogos (1929–2017), American illustrator
 Basil Gunasekara (born 1929), 7th Commander of the Sri Lanka Navy
 Basil Buzz Hargrove (born 1944), Canadian former labour union leader
 B. H. Liddell Hart (1895–1970), English soldier, military historian and leading inter-war theorist
 Basil Hetzel (born 1922), Australian medical researcher
 Basil Hiley (born 1935), British quantum physicist 
 Basil Hood (1864–1917), British librettist and lyricist
 Basil Joseph (born 1990), Indian actor/director
 Basil Mott (1859–1938), British civil engineer
 Basil O'Connor (1892–1972), American lawyer and chairman and president of the American Red Cross
 Basil Charles Godfrey Place (1921–1994), British Royal Navy rear-admiral and recipient of the Victoria Cross
 Basil Radford (1897–1952), British actor
 Basil Rathbone (1892–1967), British actor
 Basil Spence (1907–1976), Scottish architect
 Basil Thampi (1983) Indian Cricketer 
 Basil Valdez (born 1951), Filipino singer
 Basil Wolverton (1909–1978), American cartoonist, illustrator, comic book writer-artist
 Basil Zaharoff (1849–1936), Greek arms trader and financier, and chairman of the Vickers munitions company during World War I
variant Bassel
 Bassel al-Assad (1962–1994), the eldest son of the late Syrian President Hafez al-Assad
 Bassel Khartabil (1981–2015) Palestinian-Syrian open-source software developer
 Bassel Shehadeh (1984–2012) Syrian film producer

Surname
 Steve Basil (1893–1962), American baseball umpire
 Toni Basil (b. 1943), American musician, video artist, actress, and choreographer
 Richard Basil (b. 1967), American former college football coach
variant Bacile
 Giovanni Bacile (1880–1941), Italian Roman Catholic priest
variant Baseley
 Godfrey Baseley (1904–1997), American radio executive
 William Baseley, English politician, member of the Parliament of England in 1554 and 1555
variant Basile
 see Basile#Surname
variant Basilio
 see Basilio#Surname
variant Basilius
 Basilius is a Greek nobility title and names bearing this title are excluded here
 István Basilius (1549–1581), Hungarian Unitarian minister
variant Basilone
 John Basilone (1916–1945), American soldier and U.S. Marine, recipient of the Medal of Honor
variant Bassil
 Gebran Bassil (b. 1970), Lebanese politician
 Philip S. Bassil (b. 1976) Lebanese-Canadian Investment Banker and financier
 Ray Bassil (b. 1988), Lebanese athlete
variant Bazeley
 see Bazeley
variant Bazell
 Josh Bazell (b. 1970), American author and physician
 Robert Bazell (20th Century), American academic
variant Bazil
 Louis Bazil (1695–1752), French merchant and militia officer
 Ezekiel Bazil (b. 1965), Dominican politician
variant Bazley
Colin Bazley (b. 1935), Anglican bishop of Chile
Margaret Bazley (b. 1938), New Zealand public servant
Robert W. Bazley (1925–2012), American military commander
Sir Thomas Bazley, 1st Baronet (1797–1883), British industrialist and Liberal politician
variant Pasi
 Riccardo Pasi (b. 1990), Italian footballer
 Geeta Pasi (21st Century), American diplomat
variant Vasil (excluding Vasil')
 Adria Vasil (21st Century), Canadian journalist
variant Vasilchenko
see Vasilchenko
variant Vasile
 see Vasile#As a surname
variant Vasili
 Laert Vasili (b. 1974), Greek Albanian actor and director
 Petrit Vasili (21st Century), Albanian politician
variant Vasilj
 Ivan Anton Vasilj (b. 1991), Croatian football player
 Mario Vasilj (b. 1983), Swedish professional footballer
 Vladimir Vasilj (b. 1975), former Croatian professional footballer
 variant Vasko (excluding Vaskó and Vaško)
 Elmer Vasko (1935–1998), Canadian ice hockey player
 Natalya Vasko (b. 1972), Ukrainian actress
 Rick Vasko (b. 1957), Canadian ice hockey player
 variant Vasović
 see Vasović
variant Vassili
Amaury Vassili (b. 1989), French singer
Vassilis Vassili (b. 1964), Greek sculptor
variant Wasilewski
 see Wasilewski

Fictional characters
Basil, protagonist of Wilkie Collins' 1852 Basil (novel)
Basil of the Basil of Baker Street novels and the movie The Great Mouse Detective
Basil, a character in the television series Fraggle Rock
Basil Fawlty, the main character in Fawlty Towers
Basil Brush, a glove puppet fox popular on children's television in the UK
Basil (Sesame Park), main character of the Canadian children's show Sesame Park
Basil, a character in the anime and manga series Reborn!
Basil, a character on the Playhouse Disney TV series Johnny and the Sprites
Basil Wombat, a character on SeeMore's Playhouse
Basil, a character in the breeding and farming game, Harvest Moon
Basil, a main character in the role-playing horror game Omori
Basil Hallward, the artist that paints the haunting portrait of Dorian Gray in Oscar Wilde's The Picture of Dorian Gray
Basil the Bat Lord, an enemy racer in Lego Racers (video game)
Basil Stag Hare, member of the Fur and Foot Fighting Patrol in Brian Jacques' Redwall
Sir Basil Hawkins, a character in a popular manga One Piece
Basil Humphrey, Head of Scotland Yard from the film Dracula's Daughter
Basil Exposition, a character in the film Austin Powers: International Man of Mystery
Basil, Alex Delarge's snake from the film A Clockwork Orange (film)
Basil Brightberry, the gentlemouse sommelier in the children's Brambly Hedge series
Basil Ransom, a Mississippi lawyer in Henry James's 1886 novel The Bostonians
Basil, a Pirate in the film Chitty Chitty Bang Bang
Tyrannus Basilton Grimm-Pitch, a character in Carry on by Rainbow Rowell
Mrs. Basil E. Frankweiler, a character in the book From the Mixed-Up Files of Mrs. Basil E. Frankweiler by E. L. Konigsburg
Basil, a character from the children's series, Babar
Basil Steele, a character from the Welsh children's series, Fireman Sam
Basil, The Doctor's alleged first name from the BBC series, Doctor Who

References

Surnames
English given names
English-language masculine given names
English masculine given names
Given names derived from plants or flowers
Given names of Greek language origin